Kosmos 186 ( meaning Cosmos 186) and Kosmos 188 ( meaning Cosmos 188) were two uncrewed Soviet Union spacecraft that incorporated a Soyuz programme descent module for landing scientific instruments and test objects.

Mission
Because of the lethal outcome of both the Soyuz 1 and the Apollo 1 missions earlier that year it was decided to proceed with unmanned flights first. But because the Soviet Union had no ground stations outside its own territory, this meant the docking had to be fully automated. After the first attempt failed (a fly by at a distance of ), the second attempt succeeded over the South Atlantic. However, this docking was not entirely successful either — the modules were mechanically docked, but not electrically. Also, the manoeuvre had cost more fuel than anticipated.

On 27 October 1967 at 09:29:59 GMT, the Soyuz 11A511 s/n U15000-05 booster and Kosmos 186 were set up at Site 31/6 of Baikonur Cosmodrome and the planned mission could be carried out.

On 30 October 1967 at 08:12:41 GMT, the Soyuz 11A511 s/n N15000-07 booster and Kosmos 188 were set up at Site 1/5 of Baikonur Cosmodrome and the planned mission could be carried out.

The two Soviet spacecraft made the first fully automated space docking in the history of space exploration on 30 October 1967. Mutual search, approach, mooring, and docking were automatically performed by the IGLA-system onboard Kosmos 186. After 3.5 hours of joint flight, the satellites parted on a command sent from the Earth and continued to orbit separately. Officially, both made a soft landing in a predetermined region of the Soviet Union — Kosmos 186 on 31 October 1967 and Kosmos 188 on 2 November 1967. But according to Boris Chertok, "one of the vehicles was destroyed by the emergency destruction system". (See B.Chertok, Rockets and People, Vol.IV, Chapter 8, page 156)

Kosmos 186 (Soyuz 7K-OK No.6) launched first on 27 October 1967 and underwent a meticulous on-orbit checkout, followed by Kosmos 188 three days later. With Kosmos 186 taking the active role in the docking, the two craft docked just 62 minutes after the launch of Kosmos 188 (Soyuz 7K-OK No.5), the passive target spacecraft. The two craft remained mechanically docked for three and a half hours, although an electrical connection could not be made. The descent module of Kosmos 186 was successfully recovered in the Soviet Union on 31 October 1967, but the accidental firing of the self-destruct mechanism of Kosmos 188 during the descent prevented its recovery on 2 November 1967. Despite the anomalies, the automatic docking mission demonstrated a new capability for the Soviet Union that proved valuable to their future human space flight programs. Although the Soviet lunar landing programme was cancelled before an actual landing mission, automatic dockings were an integral component of their Salyut and Mir space station programs and remain in practice today on the Russian segment of the International Space Station.

This mission proved it possible to launch smaller parts and assemble them in space, thus eliminating the need for exceedingly large rockets for larger undertakings like a space station.

References

External links 

 yourtube Kosmos 186 and Kosmos 188

Soyuz uncrewed test flights
Spacecraft launched in 1967
1967 in the Soviet Union
Kosmos satellites